Tachov District is a district in the Plzeň Region of the Czech Republic. Its capital is the town of Tachov.

Administrative division
Tachov District is divided into two administrative districts of municipalities with extended competence: Tachov and Stříbro.

List of municipalities
Towns are marked in bold and market towns in italics:

Benešovice -
Bezdružice -
Bor -
Brod nad Tichou -
Broumov -
Částkov -
Cebiv -
Černošín -
Chodová Planá -
Chodský Újezd -
Ctiboř -
Dlouhý Újezd -
Erpužice -
Halže -
Horní Kozolupy -
Hošťka -
Kladruby -
Kočov -
Kokašice -
Konstantinovy Lázně -
Kostelec -
Kšice -
Lesná -
Lestkov -
Lom u Tachova -
Milíře -
Obora -
Olbramov -
Ošelín -
Planá -
Přimda -
Prostiboř -
Rozvadov -
Skapce -
Staré Sedliště -
Staré Sedlo -
Stráž -
Stříbro -
Studánka -
Sulislav -
Svojšín -
Sytno -
Tachov -
Tisová -
Třemešné -
Trpísty -
Únehle -
Vranov -
Záchlumí -
Zadní Chodov -
Zhoř

Geography

Tachov District borders Germany in the west. The terrain is hilly and along the state border, the landscape is mountainous. The territory extends into four geomorphological mesoregions: Plasy Uplands (most of the territory), Upper Palatine Forest (west), Upper Palatine Forest Foothills (a strip along the Upper Palatine Forest) and Teplá Highlands (northeast).

The only important river is the Mže, which flows across the district from west to east and forms a deep valley. Its longest tributary is the Úhlavka. The central part of the territory is rich in ponds. There are also two reservoirs, Lučina and partly Hracholusky.

There are two protected landscape areas: the northern half of Český les, and the southernmost part of Slavkovský les.

Demographics
As of 2022, Tachov District is the second least populated district in the country.

Most populated municipalities

Economy
The largest employers with its headquarters in Tachov District and at least 500 employers are:

Transport
The D5 motorway (part of the European route E50) from Prague to Plzeň and the Czech-German border passes through the district.

Sights

The most important monuments in the district, protected as national cultural monuments, are:
Přimda Castle
Slavic gord and burial mound in Bezemín
Kladruby Monastery
Hradišťský kopec gord in Okrouhlé Hradiště
Riding hall in Světce

The best-preserved settlements, protected as monument zones, are:

Bor
Planá
Stříbro
Tachov
Chodský Újezd
Horní Jadruž
Pačín
Prostiboř
Zadní Chodov

The most visited tourist destinations are the Kladruby Monastery and Přimda Castle.

References

External links

Tachov District profile on the Czech Statistical Office's website

 
Districts of the Czech Republic